The hooded siskin (Spinus magellanicus) is a small passerine bird in the finch family (Fringillidae), native to South America. It belongs to the putative clade of neotropical siskins in the genus Spinus sensu lato.

There are 11 subspecies, including the Santa Cruz hooded siskin (S. m. santaecrucis) of central and eastern Bolivia. This subspecies is sometimes considered to be a separate species.

Description
Hooded siskins are 10 to 14 cm in length. The male is largely green above and yellow below with a black head. It has a narrow yellow collar and a yellow rump. The tail is black with yellow sides to the base and the wings are black with a broad yellow band. Females are duller with a green-brown head, yellow-green breast and sides and a whitish belly.

The twittering song may be uttered from a perch or in flight. It is varied and fast, and may contain imitations of other birds.

Distribution and ecology
It inhabits woodland, savannas, scrubland, farmland, parks and gardens. It occurs from sea-level up to 5000 m. In eastern South America, it is found from central Argentina north to central Brazil. In the Andean region, it occurs from northwestern Argentina and northern Chile north to central Colombia. There is an isolated population in southeastern Venezuela, Guyana and the Brazilian state of Roraima.

It is commonly found in flocks, feeding in trees or bushes or on the ground. The diet consists mainly of seeds together with buds, leaves and some insects. Geophagy has been observed in this species.

Phylogeny
The hooded siskin is part of a recent and rapid adaptive radiation of Spinus finches in South America.

Antonio Arnaiz-Villena et al. originally placed this species as a sister taxon to the yellow-faced siskin (S. yarrellii) using genetic material sourced from birds in the Argentine lowlands, in the southeastern portion of the bird's range.  Subsequent work by Elizabeth Beckman and Christopher Witt demonstrated that birds from the Andes in the northwestern portion of the range were more closely related to the thick-billed siskin (S. crassirostris) and that hooded siskin is therefore polyphyletic and includes at least two species.

References

 Zamora J, Moscoso J, Ruiz-del-Valle V, Ernesto L, Serrano-Vela JI, Ira-Cachafeiro J, Arnaiz-Villena A (2006). "Conjoint mitochondrial phylogenetic trees for canaries Serinus spp. and goldfinches Carduelis spp. show several specific polytomies"(PDF). Ardeola 53(1): 1-17.

 Clement, Peter; Harris, Alan & Davis, John (1993): Finches and Sparrows: an identification guide. Christopher Helm, London. 
 Delgado-V., Carlos A. (2006): Observación de geofagia por el Jiguero Aliblanco Carduelis psaltria (Fringillidae). ["Report of geophagy in the Lesser Goldfinch C. psaltria (Fringillidae)"]. Boletín de la Sociedad Antioqueña de Ornitología 16(2): 31–34. [Spanish with English abstract] PDF fulltext
 Jaramillo, Alvaro; Burke, Peter & Beadle, David (2003): Field Guide to the Birds of Chile, Christopher Helm, London. 

hooded siskin
Birds of South America
hooded siskin
hooded siskin